or  ('Jaan's Day') is the longest celebrated public holiday and one of the most important summer holidays in the Estonian folk calendar. It corresponds to the English Midsummer Day.

 is arguably the most important holiday, more important than Christmas in the yearly calendar for Estonians.

As Estonian National Open Air Museum describes it, "this is a time when nature is full of power and thousands of bonfires are set on fire throughout the country to celebrate the beginning of summer and ensure good luck".

Name 

Beginning 
It is said that the traditions of  started with the fall of the Kaali meteorite around 4,000 years ago, lighting of bonfires to re-enact the falling of the meteorite when it lit the night said to seem like the sun rose again in the night.

Victory Day 
After this battle against Estonia's traditional oppressors,  and the lighting of the traditional bonfires became linked with the ideals of independence and freedom. Since 1934, June 23 is also national Victory Day of Estonia and both 23rd and 24th are holidays and flag days, when the blue-black-white tricolor is raised at sunrise. The Estonian flag is not lowered in the night between these two days.

From this fire, the flame of independence was carried across the country to light the many bonfires. During the transition to the re-establishment of Estonia's de facto independence,  became an unofficial holiday, with many work places closing down. It once again became an official national holiday in 1992.

Traditions and rituals

On , Estonians all around the country will gather with their families, or at larger events to celebrate this important day with singing and dancing and lighting the bonfires, as Estonians have done for centuries.

Some of the rituals of  have very strong folkloric roots there was also an important place in spells and fire. The best-known ritual is the lighting of the bonfire and then jumping over it. This is seen as a way of guaranteeing prosperity and avoiding bad luck. Likewise, to not light the fire is to invite the destruction of your house by fire. The fire also frightened away mischievous spirits who avoided it at all costs, thus ensuring a good harvest. So, the bigger the fire, the further the mischievous spirits stayed away.

Midsummer's eve is important for lovers. These two lovers see each other only once a year and exchange the briefest of kisses on the shortest night of the year. Earth-bound lovers go into the forest looking for the flower of the fern which is said to bloom only on that night. Also on this night, single people can follow a detailed set of instructions involving different flowers to see whom they are going to marry.

 marks a change in the farming year, specifically the break between the completion of spring sowing, summer hay-making and the hard work and activities related to do the day.

Christians 
Since the arrival of Christianity by the crusaders, the day was named St John's Eve by the church to commemorate the Nativity of Saint John the Baptist. As in the past, some Christians still try to change the pagan beliefs and rituals as they do their best to forcefully rename them, same with  that contains lighting the bonfires and jumping over them, eating, drinking, singing and dancing all through the night, predicting the future and some other romantic traditions.

See also
Jāņi (Latvia)
Joninės (Lithuania)
Midsummer
St John's Day (Estonia) (Christian)
Summer solstice and Solstice
Public holidays in Estonia

References

External links
  ERR (Estonian Public Broadcasting) - : Estonia's Most Important Holiday Decoded
  Estonian Public Broadcasting Archive a documentary of "" ['Estonian folk calendar: Midsummer Day']
 : in English, "Public Holidays Global Pty Ltd", Estonia, Midsummer Day. The same external source, in Estonian, is: 
  Estonian Government's official site for Laws and Regulations, Page of Law "Public Holidays and Days of National Importance Act" Issuer: Parliament, § 2. Public holidays 7) 24 June – Midsummer Day

Estonian culture
June observances